Hiroki Muto (Japanese: 武藤 弘樹, Mutō Hiroki) is a  Japanese archer. He competed in  Archery at the 2020 Summer Olympics. In the bronze medal match of the Men's team event, Muto hit a do-or-die bullseye in the tie-breaker set to win bronze for Japan.

References

1997 births
Living people
Place of birth missing (living people)
Archers at the 2020 Summer Olympics
Olympic archers of Japan
Medalists at the 2020 Summer Olympics
Olympic medalists in archery
Olympic bronze medalists for Japan
Japanese male archers
Archers at the 2014 Summer Youth Olympics
Archers at the 2018 Asian Games
Asian Games competitors for Japan